Pavle Dolezar also known as Paul Dolezar and Paja Dolezar (born 1 May 1944) is a Serbian football manager and former player. He was born in Yugoslavia and raised in France.

Born in Bačka Palanka, SR Serbia, back then part of Yugoslavia, he began his youth career playing with FK Bačka Bačka Palanka and FK Slavija Novi Sad. He debuted as senior in 1963 playing with FK Bačka Bačka Palanka in Yugoslav Second League until the winter-break of the 1966–67 season when he was brought by one of back then dominant clubs in the region of Vojvodina, FK Proleter Zrenjanin. In the season he joined Proleter, the club achieved promotion to the Yugoslav First League and Dolezar played with Proleter in the Yugoslav highest level in the seasons 1967–68 and 1968–69.

He then moved abroad and played with Paris-Neuilly, Heracles Almelo, AGOVV, Go Ahead Eagles, SC Heerenveen, R. Charleroi S.C., SO Cholet and US Alençon. After retiring as a footballer he became a manager and coached Neuilly-sur-Seine, SO Cholet and Béziers in France. He also managed Tunisian side AS Gabès before moving to South Africa.

In 1997 and 1998, he led the Kaizer Chief's to the Rothmans Cup title. He was sacked as manager of the Chiefs in June 1999 and was appointed as manager of Sundowns in July 1999. In 1999,he won the Rothmans Cup title again with Mamelodi Sundowns in a final against Free State Stars. After the Rothmans cup win, he went on to win the 1999 PSL Castle league with Mamelodi Sundowns. In 2005, Dolezar remarkably won the SAA Super 8 cup with Bloemfontein Celtic. It had been 20 years since Bloemfontein Celtic won silverware

References

External links
 

1946 births
Living people
People from Bačka Palanka
Yugoslav footballers
Serbian footballers
Association football midfielders
OFK Bačka players
FK Proleter Zrenjanin players
Yugoslav First League players
Ligue 2 players
R. Charleroi S.C. players
Go Ahead Eagles players
SC Heerenveen players
Heracles Almelo players
AGOVV Apeldoorn players
US Alençon players
Serbian football managers
Yugoslav football managers
Kaizer Chiefs F.C. managers
Mamelodi Sundowns F.C. managers
Black Leopards F.C. managers
AS Béziers Hérault (football) managers
AS Gabès managers